Paul Erskine Whitelaw (10 February 1910 – 28 August 1988) was a New Zealand cricketer who played for Auckland and New Zealand.

Domestic career
A right-handed opening batsman with a fine array of strokes, Whitelaw played first-class cricket for Auckland with some success from 1928–29 to 1946–47, averaging 37 runs per innings.

In 1934–35, playing for Auckland against Wellington, he scored 115, his first first-class century, in the first innings, and 155 in the second innings. In 1936–37, playing for Auckland against Otago at Dunedin, Whitelaw and Bill Carson set a world record that stood for almost 40 years by adding 445 for the third wicket. The partnership, which began with the score on 25 for 2, took only 268 minutes. Whitelaw's 195 in this match was his highest first-class score.

International career
He made two Test match appearances, both on the short tour of New Zealand by the 1932-33 MCC side that followed the Bodyline tour of Australia. Both matches were dominated by the batting of Wally Hammond, who scored 563 runs in two innings, being dismissed just once. Whitelaw made 64 runs from four innings, two of them not out. He also represented New Zealand in matches against the MCC team led by Errol Holmes in 1935–36. He was twelfth man when New Zealand played Australia in a single Test in Wellington in 1945–46.

Personal life
Whitelaw married Alison Hall (1910–2004) in July 1948. She was the scorer for his cricket club, Parnell, and was the first woman to be an official scorer for a Test match, when she scored during the Fourth Test in Auckland in 1930.

References

External links

1910 births
1988 deaths
Auckland cricketers
New Zealand Test cricketers
New Zealand cricketers
North Island cricketers